St. Francis de Sales parish is a Roman Catholic church located at 135 E 96th St in Manhattan on the Upper East Side.

Notable parishioners 
 James Cagney, American dancer and actor
 Sydney Magruder Washington, American dancer and blogger

References

Roman Catholic Archdiocese of New York
Roman Catholic churches in Manhattan
Upper East Side